Interlude is an EP by the German power metal band Iron Savior, composed of five live tracks, four new songs, and one cover. The live tracks were recorded at the 1998 Wacken Open Air festival during the tour promoting their first album, Iron Savior. The new songs return to the ongoing science fiction story that began on the debut album and continued on the band's second album Unification. "Desert Plains" is a cover of Judas Priest's song from the album Point of Entry. It is the first release to feature drummer Thomas Nack.

Track listing

 The Enhanced CD portion of the disc contains a band biography, music player, photos, a recap of the band's ongoing science fiction story, and a video clip of the band performing "Atlantis Falling" at Wacken Open Air 1998.

Personnel
Iron Savior
 Piet Sielck – lead vocals, guitar
 Kai Hansen – guitar, vocals
 Andreas Kück – keyboards, backing vocals
 Jan-Sören Eckert – bass, backing vocals
 Thomas Nack – drums and percussion

Production
 Piet Sielck – producer, engineer, mixing
 Roxanne – recording engineer (live tracks only)
 Ernst Seider – front-of-house engineer (live tracks only)
 Tim Sielck, Rainer Drechsler, Melanie Dreysse, Angela Sielck, Gryta Coates – photography
 Angelika Bardou – layout and artwork
 Mervyn Müller – programming and design (Enhanced CD portion)

References

1999 EPs
Iron Savior albums
Noise Records EPs